Rai Bahadur Amba Prasad (c. 1860 – 1950) was an Indian businessman and philanthropist.

Early years
Amba Prasad was born in Delhi c. 1860, in an eminent business family. His father, Lala Gopal Rai, and grandfather, Lala Gulab Singh were influential traders and bankers of Delhi. Little is known of his childhood and education, however his early education probably took place at his family home in the Khari Baoli area of Delhi. He studied at the Anglo-Sanskrit Victoria Jubilee High-School.

As a young businessman he went into the chemical industry manufacturing and trading in dyes and chemicals. He started a trading company - Amba Prasad Jadavjee & Co.. He was a pioneer in early advertising and introduced colorful and graphic labels for his products. He later sold the rights to these labels and trademarks to companies like Ciba and Bayer.

Philanthropy

His father founded the Delhi Pinjrapole Society at Kishanganj in Delhi to take in and look after abandoned and old cows. Amba Prasad took over the reins after him and expanded the lands owned by the gaushala by hundreds of acres. The society still exists but is not under family control. He also served as the Municipal Commissioner of Delhi and as an Honorary Magistrate.

In 1916 his old school needed to expand so he contributed Rs 80,000 and built a new school building at Daryaganj; the building is known as Amba Prasad Vidyalay, and is now a registered heritage structure.

In 1922, he was one of the founder members of the Roshanara Club, which had the first cricket field in Delhi at Roshanara Bagh. 
He was one of the few non-royal Indians invited to attend the Delhi Durbar to commemorate the coronation of King George V in 1911.

For the trading community he founded the Kirana Committee of Delhi, one of the oldest trader associations in India.
Being very religious, he built several temples and dharamshalas in Delhi, Vrindavan and Mathura, among other places. He also developed several ghats for religious ceremonies and bathing on the banks of the Yamuna river, in Delhi. These, however, have been swallowed by the Ring Road, as the Yamuna flows further away now. He was also one of the founders of the Hindu College in Delhi. He died in 1950, aged approximately 90 years.

Family
He was succeeded by his son, Rai Sahib Lala Shiv Shanker Lall (1908–1996), who carried on his charity and social work in old Delhi. His grandson, Bhawani Shanker (born 1931) has contributed to educational and religious institutions of Delhi, mainly serving the Modern School and Hindu College.
A science laboratory at Modern School, Barakhamba Road, is named after him, the R.B. Amba Prasad Physics & Chemistry Lab.

Bhawani Shanker also built the Amba Cinema named after Amba Pershad, which opened in 1963. In 1992 another landmark of the New Delhi skyline opened, also named after Amba Pershad,  Ambadeep Building on Kasturba Gandhi Marg, one of the tallest buildings in Delhi.
Bhawani Shanker has two sons Ashwini Shanker (born 26th December1958), Awini Ambuj Shanker (born 27 January 1973) and a daughter Daksha (Shanker) Jaidka (born 20 September 1975).

References

External links
Hindu article
 sify.com
 https://www.flickr.com/photos/85296574@N00/398184580/

1860 births
1950 deaths
Rai Bahadurs
Indian philanthropists
Founders of Indian schools and colleges
Businesspeople from Delhi